Eleanore T. Wurtzel is an American biologist currently at City University of New York and an elected fellow of the American Association for the Advancement of Science. Her research interests include studying plant biochemical pathways to provide knowledge and tools for developing sustainable solutions to worldwide Vitamin A deficiency and malnutrition.

References

Year of birth missing (living people)
Living people
Fellows of the American Association for the Advancement of Science
City University of New York faculty
21st-century American biologists
Lehman College faculty